Nohra al-Chalouhi military base ( Thouknat Nuhra al-Shaluhi) is a Lebanese Army base under the jurisdiction of the North regional command (Bahjat Ghanem military base). Founded on February 1, 1980, the base is located in Batroun, North Governorate.

Mission
The mission of the military base includes:
 Defending all the facilities located in the Nohra al-Shalouhi military base
 Supplying food, lubricants and maintenance for deployed units
 Providing back up and defense for the regiments in the region
 Providing development programs in the region

See also
 Lebanese Navy

References
 

Lebanese Army bases